Carex senta, known as swamp carex, is a species of sedge that was first described by Francis Boott in 1867. It is found in western North America.

References

senta
Plants described in 1867